Chlorocrisia is a monotypic moth genus in the subfamily Arctiinae erected by George Hampson in 1911. Its single species, Chlorocrisia irrorata, was first described by Walter Rothschild in 1910. It is found in Peru.

References

Arctiini
Monotypic moth genera
Taxa named by George Hampson
Moths of South America